Michael Mor Brisker (מייקל מור בריסקר; born February 21, 1998) is an Israeli basketball player for Ironi Kiryat Ata of the Israeli Premier League. He plays the shooting guard position.

Biography
Brisker is from Tel Aviv, Israel.  His father is American-Israeli former basketball player Mark Brisker.

Brisker represented gold-medal-winning Israel at the 2018 FIBA U20 European Championship in Germany. He averaged 15.3 points, 3.9 rebounds, 2.9 assists, and 1.9 steals per game.

On January 5, 2020, he signed with Maccabi Haifa in the Israeli Basketball Premier League. In 2020-21 he averaged 9.7 points and 1.6 assists per game, and had an .896 free throw percentage.

On August 8, 2021, he signed with Hapoel Gilboa Galil of the Israeli Basketball Premier League.  In 2021-22 he averaged 11.6 points and 2.4 assists per game, and shot .426 from three-point range and .851 from the free-throw line. He was named 2021-2022 Israeli BSL Most Improved Player.

In Summer 2022 he signed with Ironi Kiryat Ata of the Israeli Basketball Premier League.

References

External links
Basketball Reference page

1998 births
Living people
Competitors at the 2019 Summer Universiade
Hapoel Gilboa Galil Elyon players
Israeli men's basketball players
Maccabi Haifa B.C. players
Shooting guards
Sportspeople from Tel Aviv